Suley Musah (born 6 May 1979) is a retired Ghanaian professional footballer who played as a defender and last played for East Bengal FC in 2008.

Career
Suley Musah began his career at Afienya United FC as a right back in the Ghana Premier League. In 1998, he signed for East Bengal FC along with fellow countrymen Jackson Egypong and Emmanuel Opoku to play in the National Football League. Musah spent 6 seasons in the East Bengal colours before leaving for Tollygunge Agragami in 2004–05. In 2005-06 he joined Mohammedan Sporting and after 1 season, he joined Air India in 2006 where he spent 2 seasons. He returned to play for East Bengal in 2008–09 season, before retiring from professional football.

In 2000–01 season, Suley Musah along with countryman Jackson Egypong, under coach Monoranjan Bhattacharya helped East Bengal FC win their first National Football League title. East Bengal conceded just 9 goals, the fewest goals they ever conceded in the league till date.

In 2002–03 season, Suley Musah had the best season in India with East Bengal FC, under coach Subhash Bhowmick, as the Red and Gold brigade won all 5 tournaments that they had participated in: 2002 Calcutta Football League, 2002 IFA Shield, 2002 Durand Cup, 2002-03 National Football League and Independence Day Cup; equaling their own record of winning 5 trophies in a season which they achieved back in 1972-73 and 1973–74 season.

In 2003–04 season, Suley Musah captained the East Bengal FC side and won 2003-04 National Football League, 2003 Calcutta Football League and 2003 ASEAN Club Championship held in Jakarta, Indonesia defeating 2002–03 AFC Champions League runners-up BEC Tero Sasana 3–1 in the final.

In his illustrious career in Indian football with East Bengal FC, Suley Musah has scored 41 goals in the Red and Gold colours and have won 19 trophies including 3 National Football League titles.

Honours

Club
East Bengal
ASEAN Club Championship (1): 2003
National Football League (3): 2000-01, 2002-03, 2003-04
Calcutta Football League (6): 1998, 1999, 2000, 2002, 2003, 2004
IFA Shield (3): 2000, 2001, 2002
Durand Cup (2): 2002, 2004
All Airlines Gold Cup (1): 2001
Independence Day Cup (1): 2002-03
San Miguel International Cup (1): 2004
McDowell Cup (1): 2000

References

External links

1979 births
Living people
Ghanaian footballers
I-League players
East Bengal Club players
Association football defenders
Tollygunge Agragami FC players